Kevin John McDougal (born May 18, 1977) is a former American football running back who played two seasons with the Indianapolis Colts of the National Football League. He played college football at Colorado State University and attended Arvada West High School in Arvada, Colorado.

College career
McDougal played for the Colorado State Rams from 1996 to 1999. In 1999, he was named the Mountain West Conference offensive player of the year and scholar-athlete of the year by the National Football Foundation and Hall of Fame. He also played in the Hula Bowl and was named to three all-conference teams. He was inducted into the Colorado State University Sports Hall of Fame in 2012.

Professional career

McDougal played in 15 games for the Indianapolis Colts from 2001 to 2001. He was placed on the waived-injured list by the Colts on September 1, 2002.

References

External links
College stats

Living people
1977 births
Players of American football from Denver
American football running backs
Colorado State Rams football players
Indianapolis Colts players